The May 2010 Northern Sumatra earthquake occurred with a moment magnitude of 7.2 on May 9 at 12:59 PM local time (5:59 UTC) in Indonesia. The epicenter was 215 km from Banda Aceh on the northwestern tip of Sumatra. According to USGS, it is likely that this earthquake occurred along the interface of the Indo-Australia Plate and the Sunda Plate. It was one of a sequence of large earthquakes along the Sunda megathrust in 2000s. It was also felt in Laos, Malaysia, Myanmar, Singapore and Thailand. Broken windows and cracks in the walls were reported in the control tower at Cut Nyak Dhien Airport near Meulaboh.

See also
List of earthquakes in 2010
List of earthquakes in Indonesia

References

2010 earthquakes
2010 in Indonesia
Earthquakes in Indonesia
May 2010 events in Indonesia
2010 Northern Sumatra earthquake
Earthquakes in Sumatra